Samuel Weka Stewart (born 5 December 1962), also known by the nicknames of "Slammin' Sam" and "Wheka", is a New Zealand former professional rugby league footballer who represented New Zealand. He played for the Newcastle Knights when they first started competing in the New South Wales Rugby League premiership and became the Knights first captain.

Playing career
Stewart was a Wellington Rugby League player for the Randwick club. He made his senior and Wellington debut's in 1981 and was a Junior Kiwi that same year. On the Junior Kiwis 1981 tour of Australia, Stewart signed a contract to play with the North Sydney Bears, however, later opted to instead pursue his career in the New Zealand Police. He was the New Zealand Police Triathlon champion in 1985 and was named the Police Sportsman of the year in 1987.

Stewart was named one of the Wellington Rugby League's players of the year in 1983. He toured Great Britain and France for the New Zealand Universities side. In 1984, Stewart was first selected for the Central Districts team. Stewart was part of Randwick's hat trick of Wellington Rugby League premierships between 1983 and 1985.

Stewart then crossed the Tasman, playing for the Newcastle Knights from 1988 until 1992 and captained their inaugural side. After 81 matches, Stewart was made the Knights first life member. 

In 1993, Stewart travelled to England and joined the London Crusaders before spending time with Hull Kingston Rovers.

Representative career
Stewart played for the Wellington and New Zealand Māori sides, captaining the Māori at the 1986 Pacific Cup.

Stewart played for the New Zealand national rugby league team from 1985 until 1989. He was first selected for the 1985 tour of Great Britain and France, playing in eleven games on tour. He also toured Australia and Papua New Guinea in 1986 and 1987 and competed in the 1988 World Cup. Before finishing his career in 1989 with tests against Australia and a tour of Great Britain and France. Stewart finished his career having played in sixteen test matches and forty games in total.

In 1988, he was chosen for the Rest of the World side in a match against Australia during their Bicentenary celebrations.

Later years
Stewart is now based in Queensland where he did some scouting for the New Zealand Rugby League. In 2008, he participated in a bike ride from Burleigh to Bondi to raise money for prostate cancer.

Legacy
In 2012, he was named in the Wellington Rugby League's Team of the Century.

References

External links
 (archived by web.archive.org) Hull Kingston Rovers ~ Captains
NZRL Roll of Honour

1962 births
Living people
Central Districts rugby league team players
Hull Kingston Rovers players
Junior Kiwis players
London Broncos players
New Zealand Māori rugby league players
New Zealand Māori rugby league team players
New Zealand national rugby league team players
New Zealand police officers
New Zealand rugby league players
Newcastle Knights captains
Newcastle Knights players
Randwick Kingfishers players
Rugby league players from Wellington City
Rugby league second-rows
Wellington rugby league team players